Alara may refer to:

People
 Alara of Ilara-Mokin, the king of Ilara-Mokin land in Nigeria
 Alara of Nubia, a king of Kush
 Āḷāra Kālāma, a hermit saint, a teacher of yogic meditation and teacher of Gautama Buddha
 Luis Alberto Fernández Alara (born 1946), Argentine Roman Catholic bishop
 Cheche Alara, music director

Other uses
 ALARA, an acronym for "As Low As Reasonably Achievable"
 Alara (bug), an insect genus in the family Derbidae
 Alara Castle, a medieval castle in Alanya, southern Turkey
 Alara (fairy), a lake creature from Turkish mythology
 Alara block, a block of card expansions for the trading card game Magic: The Gathering
 Alara Kitan, a character on the science- fiction series Orville
 Alara is a Turkish name, which means ‘Water Fairy”